Dort may refer to:

 Dort (surname), includes a list of people with the name
 Dort Motor Car Company, an automobile manufacturer in Flint, Michigan from 1915 to 1924
 Dort or Dordrecht, a city and municipality in the western Netherlands

See also
 
 
 Dordt (disambiguation)
 Dord (disambiguation)